Vojtěch Hačecký (born 29 March 1987) is a Czech former professional racing cyclist. He rode at the 2015 UCI Track Cycling World Championships.

Major results

2007
 6th Prague–Karlovy Vary–Prague
2009
 1st  Time trial, National Under-23 Road Championships
 1st Stage 1 Grand Prix Guillaume Tell
 2nd ZLM Tour
 6th Ronde van Vlaanderen U23
 8th La Côte Picarde
 9th Road race, UEC European Under-23 Road Championships
2010
 6th Sparkassen Giro Bochum
 6th Antwerpse Havenpijl
 10th Overall Tour du Loir-et-Cher
 10th Classic Loire Atlantique
2011
 8th Overall Tour of Taihu Lake
 9th Memoriał Andrzeja Trochanowskiego
2012
 1st Stage 6 Tour d'Azerbaïdjan
2013
 2nd Time trial, National Road Championships
2014
 4th Tour of Yancheng Coastal Wetlands
2016
 1st Memorial Grundmanna I Wizowskiego
 5th Memoriał Romana Siemińskiego
 6th Memoriał Andrzeja Trochanowskiego
2017
 1st Stage 1 (TTT) Czech Cycling Tour
 2nd GP Slovakia, Visegrad 4 Bicycle Race
 3rd Memoriał Romana Siemińskiego
 5th Memoriał Andrzeja Trochanowskiego
2018
 Visegrad 4 Bicycle Race
2nd GP Poland
4th GP Slovakia
 7th Memoriał Romana Siemińskiego
 10th Memoriał Andrzeja Trochanowskiego

References

External links

1987 births
Living people
Czech male cyclists
Place of birth missing (living people)